South Memphis, one of the oldest portions of Memphis, Tennessee, is a community stretching from Midtown and Downtown to the Mississippi state line. In its early days, it was primarily an agrarian community. South Memphis has many well-known neighborhoods including Whitehaven, Lauderdale Sub, Longview, Riverside, Lakeview Gardens, Prospect Park, Dukestown, Gaslight Square, Wilbert Heights, Mallory Heights, Dixie Heights, Barton Heights, Elliston Heights, Handy Holiday, Chickasaw Village, Pine Hill, Indian Hills, Bunker Hill, Westwood, Boxtown,  West Junction, Walker Homes, Coro Lake, Nehemiah, and French Fort. Many of these neighborhoods are considered home to many famous hip hop/R&B singers and rappers.  Many locations in South Memphis are also considered a hotbed for crime and violence due to the high amount of gang influence and the overall poverty level of the area. But South Memphis is known for its plentiful houses of worship including Mt. Vernon Baptist Church Westwood, St. Andrew AME Church, Washington Chapel CME Church, East Trigg Baptist Church, White's Chapel AME Church, Union Valley Baptist Church, Enon Springs Baptist Church, Warner Temple AME Zion Church, Unity Baptist Church, Ford's Chapel AME Zion Church, St. Augustine Catholic Church, and Monumental Baptist Church, just naming a few.

History
South Memphis was incorporated January 6, 1846, and an election for mayor and eight aldermen was held on the third Saturday of the same month, resulting in the election of Sylvester Bailey, mayor, and A. B. Shaw, H. H. Menus, George W. Davis, W. Howard, J. E. Merriman, John Brown, J. P. Keiser and James Kennedy, aldermen.  The boundaries of South Memphis were defined as follows: On the east, south and west the boundaries are the same as the South Memphis tract, and on the north the boundary line commences in the center of the Mississippi River, opposite the rise of Union Street; thence east with the center of Union Street, as at present laid off until the same intersects with the Pigeon Roost road; thence with the south side of Pigeon Roost road to the east line of the South Memphis tract of land.  On September 4, South Memphis was divided into four wards.  The treasurer for the first corporate year made a report showing that the revenue amounted to $6,266.17, and licenses, etc., to $3,750.50.  John T. Trezevant was mayor in 1847-48 and A. B. Taylor in 1849.  The last meeting of the mayor and aldermen of South Memphis took place December 31, 1849.

Notable sites
Notable sites in South Memphis include The firehouse known as The Black Arts Alliance, Stax Museum, most famously Elvis Presley's Graceland mansion, LeMoyne-Owen College, Thomas B. Davis YMCA, Crystal Palace Skating Rink, T.O. Fuller State Park, Southgate Shopping Center, Southland Mall and the historic cemeteries Zion, Rose Hill, Mt Carmel, New Park, and Elmwood. As well, South Memphis is home to the finest restaurants which include the legendary Four Way Grill, Kimble Fish Market, Interstate Bar BQ, A&R Bar BQ, Big Bill's Bar BQ, Stein's, Kountry Kitchen, Daisy's, Coletta's, Jack Pirtle's Chicken and Uncle Lou's Chicken.

Highways and ZIP codes
Several important highways run through South Memphis, including I-55, U.S. Route 51 (Elvis Presley Blvd), 61 (South Third) and 64. The ZIP codes of South Memphis are 38106, 38109, 38126, 38114 and 38116.

List of people from South Memphis
Pooh Shiesty - rapper
Big30 - rapper and childhood friend of fellow rapper Pooh Shiesty
Carla Thomas- singer
Key Glock- rapper
Marion Barry- mayor of Washington D.C. from 1979 to 1990 and from 1995 to 1999
Marquita Bradshaw, activist & Democratic candidate in the 2020 United States Senate election in Tennessee
Willie Herenton- mayor of Memphis from 1992 to 2009
Glenda Glover- first woman president of Tennessee State University
Johnny Ace- 1950s R&B star
Elise Neal- actress
J. Blackfoot- singer
  Andrea Miller- first woman president  of LeMoyne-Owen College
D'Army Bailey- Civil Rights activist, judge and actor
Maxine Smith - Civil Rights activist and Memphis City School Board member from 1971 to 1995
Maurice White- Leader of Earth, Wind And Fire
Harold Ford Jr.- United States Congressman from 1997 to 2007
Aretha Franklin- Queen Of Soul
DJ Paul- Academy Award-winning rapper and producer
Rosco Gordon- singer and musician
Benjamin Hooks- Civil Rights lawyer and judge who was head of the NAACP from 1977 to 1993
Gilbert E. Patterson- Presiding Bishop of COGIC from 2000 until his death in 2007
Booker T. Jones- musician
Frank Stokes- blues singer and musician
Anita Ward- singer
David Porter- songwriter
Tay Keith- producer
Tommy Wright III-rapper and producer
Tela- rapper
Qyntel Woods- former NBA player, now plays for Lagun Aro GBC in Spain
Playa Fly- rapper
W. Herbert Brewster- gospel songwriter notably Mahalia Jackson's Move On Up A Little Higher
Andre Turner - former NBA player known as 'The Little General'
Thaddeus Young- NBA player
Young Dolph- rapper (1985-2021)
Blac Youngsta- rapper
Rufus Jones- a member of the Tennessee House of Representatives from 1981 to 1996
Lois DeBerry- first woman Speaker Pro Tempore in the Tennessee House of Representatives
Ben Cauley- musician and original member of the Barkays, who was the lone survivor of the 1967 plane crash that claimed the lives of his bandmates and Otis Redding.
Moneybagg Yo - rapper
Big Scarr- rapper
Eric Jerome Dickey-author

References

Neighborhoods in Memphis, Tennessee